Tubular glands are glands with a tube-like shape throughout their length, in contrast with alveolar glands, which have a saclike secretory portion.

Tubular glands are further classified as one  of the following types:

Additional images

See also
 skin - glands in skin structure
 hair follicles - for hair growth

References

Additional images

Glands